Rae Burrell (born June 6, 2000) is an American professional basketball player for the Los Angeles Sparks of the Women's National Basketball Association (WNBA). She played college basketball for the Tennessee Volunteers after attending Liberty High School in Henderson, Nevada, where she was named the Las Vegas Review-Journal Best of Nevada Preps Female Athlete of the Year in 2018.

College career
Burrell was ranked the 43rd overall recruit by ESPN's HoopGurlz and committed to play for the Tennessee Volunteers. In her freshman season, she played in every game - averaging 12.7 minutes. She scored a season high of 14 points, twice, against Presbyterian and Florida A&M.

During her sophomore campaign, Burrell became the team's top reserve. She finished the year averaging 10.5 points and 5.5 rebounds. She also recorded the first double-double of her career against Mississippi State with 20 points, 10 rebounds, three steals, and one block.

As a junior, Burrell averaged 16.8 points and 4.6 rebounds per game. She also was the only Volunteer to start all the games. She played well in the NCAA Tournament, scoring 22 points against Middle Tennessee in their opening game.

Before her senior season, Burrell was ranked the 24th best women's college basketball player entering the 2021–2022 season. In an early game against Southern Illinois, she went down with a knee injury that caused her to miss several weeks. After returning from injury, Burrell played in 22 games, averaging 12.3 points and 3.9 rebounds. She turned up her play late in the year after fellow guard Jordan Horston went down with an injury. She led the Volunteers back to the Sweet Sixteen - before falling to the Louisville Cardinals. She scored 22 points to end her Tennessee career.

On March 29, Burrell announced on Instagram that she would not be taking her COVID-Extra Year and would be putting her name in the 2022 WNBA Draft.

College statistics

Professional career

Los Angeles Sparks
Burrell was selected 9th overall in the 2022 WNBA Draft by the Los Angeles Sparks.

WNBA career statistics

Regular season

|-
| align="left" | 2022
| align="left" | Los Angeles
| 3 || 1 || 14.7 || .111 || .167 || 1.000 || 1.0 || 0.3 || 0.7 || 0.0 || 0.3 || 1.7
|-
| align="left" | Career
| align="left" | 1 year, 1 team
| 3 || 1 || 14.7 || .111 || .167 || 1.000 || 1.0 || 0.3 || 0.7 || 0.0 || 0.3 || 1.7

References

External links
WNBA bio
Tennessee Volunteers bio

2000 births
Living people
American women's basketball players
Basketball players from Nevada
Guards (basketball)
Forwards (basketball)
Tennessee Lady Volunteers basketball players
Los Angeles Sparks draft picks
Los Angeles Sparks players
Sportspeople from Las Vegas